East Timor consumes 125 GWh of electricity per annum, an average of 95 kWh per person. The country has about 270 MW of electricity capacity, 119 MW in the city of Hera. 

Most of the energy infrastructure was destroyed by the Indonesian militias during the 1999 East Timorese crisis. In 2005, the government identified the high price of electricity (US$0.20 per kWh) as a deterrent to development. Gariuai Hydroelectric Plant is the country's only hydro plant, with a production capacity of 326 kW. Many people rely on diesel generators. A feasibility study of 2007–10 concluded that the country had huge potential for renewable energy.

See also 

 Energy in Indonesia
 List of power stations in East Timor
 Rural electrification
 List of renewable energy topics by country

References